Ellipteroides is a genus of crane fly in the family Limoniidae.

Species
Subgenus Ellipteroides Becker, 1907
E. atropolitus (Alexander, 1937)
E. bifastigatus Mendl, 1987
E. brunnescens (Edwards, 1926)
E. ebenomyia (Alexander, 1959)
E. friesei (Mannheims, 1967)
E. lateralis (Macquart, 1835)
E. meioneurus (Alexander, 1962)
E. piceus Becker, 1907
E. pictilis (Alexander, 1958)
E. rohuna (Alexander, 1958)
E. schmidi (Alexander, 1957)
E. tenebrosus (Edwards, 1928)
E. terebrellus (Alexander, 1931)
E. thiasodes (Alexander, 1958)
Subgenus Progonomyia Alexander, 1920
E. acanthias (Alexander, 1941)
E. acrissimus (Alexander, 1944)
E. adelus (Alexander, 1949)
E. alatus (Alexander, 1981)
E. altivolans (Alexander, 1942)
E. argentinensis (Alexander, 1920)
E. atroapicatus (Alexander, 1938)
E. balzapambae (Alexander, 1941)
E. bifasciolatus (Alexander, 1937)
E. brevifurca (Alexander, 1917)
E. catamarcensis (Alexander, 1941)
E. chiloensis (Alexander, 1969)
E. compactus (Alexander, 1941)
E. destrictus (Alexander, 1939)
E. dolorosus (Alexander, 1922)
E. eriopteroides (Alexander, 1926)
E. fieldi (Alexander, 1966)
E. flaveolus (Alexander, 1921)
E. forceps (Alexander, 1941)
E. hesperius (Alexander, 1926)
E. histrionicus (Alexander, 1943)
E. hyperplatys (Alexander, 1944)
E. maestus (Alexander, 1921)
E. magistratus (Alexander, 1949)
E. melampodius (Alexander, 1979)
E. natalensis (Alexander, 1917)
E. nigrobimbo (Alexander, 1934)
E. nigroluteus (Alexander, 1971)
E. ominosus (Alexander, 1926)
E. ovalis (Alexander, 1949)
E. paraensis (Alexander, 1920)
E. paramoensis (Alexander, 1944)
E. patruelis (Alexander, 1930)
E. perturbatus (Alexander, 1930)
E. peruvianus (Alexander, 1922)
E. platymerellus (Alexander, 1947)
E. pleurolineatus (Alexander, 1929)
E. plumbeus (Alexander, 1946)
E. pulchrissimus (Alexander, 1921)
E. quinqueplagiatus (Alexander, 1931)
E. saturatus (Alexander, 1937)
E. saxicola (Alexander, 1923)
E. serenus (Alexander, 1922)
E. slossonae (Alexander, 1914)
E. subcostatus (Alexander, 1919)
E. subsaturatus (Alexander, 1942)
E. synchrous (Alexander, 1929)
E. tessellatus (Alexander, 1943)
E. thiosema (Alexander, 1921)
E. transvaalensis (Alexander, 1960)
E. tridens (Alexander, 1979)
E. velutinus (Alexander, 1916)
E. weiseri (Alexander, 1920)
E. zionicola (Alexander, 1948)
Subgenus Protogonomyia Alexander, 1934
E. acucurvatus (Alexander, 1968)
E. acustylatus (Alexander, 1962)
E. adrastea Stary and Mendl, 1984
E. aitholodes (Alexander, 1961)
E. alboscutellatus (von Roser, 1840)
E. alomatus (Alexander, 1963)
E. apocryphus (Alexander, 1968)
E. chaoi (Alexander, 1949)
E. clista (Alexander, 1962)
E. clitellatus (Alexander, 1934)
E. cobelura (Alexander, 1973)
E. confluentus (Alexander, 1924)
E. contostyla (Alexander, 1968)
E. distifurca (Alexander, 1962)
E. glabristyla (Alexander, 1968)
E. gracilis (Brunetti, 1918)
E. hutsoni (Stary, 1971)
E. ida Stary and Mendl, 1984
E. lateromacula (Alexander, 1968)
E. lenis (Alexander, 1937)
E. limbatus (von Roser, 1840)
E. megalomatus (Alexander, 1962)
E. namtokensis (Alexander, 1953)
E. neapiculatus (Alexander and Alexander, 1973)
E. nigripes (Brunetti, 1912)
E. nilgirianus (Alexander, 1950)
E. pakistanicus (Alexander, 1957)
E. pellax (Alexander, 1968)
E. praetenuis (Alexander, 1945)
E. quadridens loehmeri Mendl, 1987
E. quadridens quadridens (Savchenko, 1972)
E. rejectus (Alexander, 1968)
E. scoteinus (Alexander, 1968)
E. scutellumalbum (Alexander, 1923)
E. strenuus (Brunetti, 1912)
E. thiorhopalus (Alexander, 1962)
E. tienmuensis (Alexander, 1940)
Subgenus Ptilostenodes Alexander, 1931
E. amiculus (Alexander, 1936)
E. capitulus (Alexander, 1968)
E. omissus (Lackschewitz, 1940)
E. pakistanensis (Alexander, 1957)
E. ptilostenellus javanicus (Alexander, 1931)
E. ptilostenellus ptilostenellus (Alexander, 1931)
E. ptilostenoides (Alexander, 1928)
E. stenomerus (Alexander, 1968)
E. uniplagiatus (Alexander, 1937)
Subgenus Ramagonomyia Alexander, 1968
E. bisiculifer (Alexander, 1963)
E. protensus (Alexander, 1963)
Subgenus Sivagonomyia Alexander, 1968
E. discolophallos (Alexander, 1968)

References

Limoniidae
Nematocera genera